Filmore may refer to:

People
 John Filmore (1788–1839), British naval officer
 Tommy Filmore (1906–1954), Canadian ice hockey player

Places
 Filmore, New Orleans, a neighborhood New Orleans, Louisiana, USA
 Filmore Township, Bollinger County, Missouri, USA

See also
 Fillmore (disambiguation)